Acacia resinicostata is a shrub belonging to the genus Acacia and the subgenus Phyllodineae native to north eastern Australia.

Description
It branchlets have small rounded protuberances and crowded, light green, linear to narrowly oblong shaped flat phyllodes that are straight or incurved. The simple inflorescences occur singly in the axils and have spherical flower-heads that contain 25 to 35 deep lemon yellow coloured flowers. The firmly chartaceous seed pods that form after flowering have a narrowly oblong shape with a length up to  containing longitudinally arranged seeds.

Distribution
It is a disjunct distribution and is endemic to a small area in the Carnarvon Range in south eastern Queensland and around  further south between Djuan and Karara where it is found in dissected sandstone country in skeletal soils as a part of open woodland communities.

See also
 List of Acacia species

References

resinicostata
Flora of Queensland
Plants described in 1974
Taxa named by Leslie Pedley